St. Elizabeth Hospital may refer to:

United States 

 Saint Elizabeth Community Hospital (Red Bluff, California)
 St. Elizabeth's Hospital (O'Fallon, Illinois), in the Hospital Sisters Health System
 St. Elizabeth Hospital (Gonzales, Louisiana), now Our Lady of the Lake Ascension
 St. Elizabeth's Hospital (Boston, Massachusetts), now St. Elizabeth's Medical Center
 St. Elizabeth Hospital (Hannibal, Missouri)
 St. Elizabeth Hospital (Manhattan, New York City) opened in 1890 and now closed
 St. Elizabeth Ann Rehabilitation Center (Staten Island, New York City) opened in 1993
 St. Elizabeth Hospital, now St. Elizabeth Medical Center (Utica, New York)
 St. Elizabeth Hospital (Elizabeth, New Jersey), 1905; now Trinitas Regional Medical Center
 St. Elizabeth Youngstown Hospital (Youngstown, Ohio) (part of Mercy Health Partners)
 St. Elizabeth Health Services (Baker City, Oregon)
 St. Elizabeth Hospital (Beaumont, Texas)
 St. Elizabeths Hospital (Washington, D.C.)
 St. Elizabeth Hospital (Appleton, Wisconsin)

Elsewhere
St. Elizabeth's Hospital, Hyderabad, Pakistan
St Elizabeth Mission Hospital, South Africa
Sint-Elisabeth Hospital, Willemstad , Curaçao
St. Elizabeth's Hospital, a predecessor of Shanghai Chest Hospital

See also
St. Elizabeth Medical Center (disambiguation)